Erigeron is a large genus of plants in the composite family (Asteraceae). It is placed in the tribe Astereae and is closely related to the Old World asters (Aster) and the true daisies (Bellis). The genus has a cosmopolitan distribution, but the highest diversity occurs in North America.

Etymology

Its English name, fleabane, is shared with related plants in several other genera. It appears to be derived from a belief that the dried plants repelled fleas or that the plants were poisonous to fleas. The noun  is masculine, so that specific epithets should have masculine endings (e.g. glaucus) to agree with it. However, authors have incorrectly used neuter endings (e.g. glaucum), because the ending -on resembles the ending of Ancient Greek neuter second declension nouns, as Augustin Pyramus de Candolle did in his 1836 account of the genus.

Description
The species may be annuals, biennials, or perennials. They are well-branched with erect stems, characterized by their numerous white, lavender, or pink ray flowers and yellow disc flowers. Some members of this group have no ray flowers. The pappus (=modified calyx, forming a crown) is shorter than in Aster, and consists of bristles. The ray florets are narrower than in Aster, but are clearly longer than the involucre (=whorled bracts).

Cultivation
Many species are used as ornamental plants, with numerous named cultivars such as 'Wayne Roderick', 'Charity', 'Foersters Liebling', and 'Dunkelste aller' ("The darkest of all" with semidouble, deep-violet flower heads).

Ecology
Erigeron species are used as food plants by the larvae of some Lepidoptera species including Bucculatrix angustata, Coleophora squamosella (which feeds exclusively on E. acris), Schinia intermontana, Schinia obscurata (both of which also feed exclusively on Erigeron), Schinia sexata (which feeds exclusively on E. glabellus) and Schinia villosa. Aboveground biomass of Erigeron in montane meadows decreases with decreased water availability/increased temperatures.

Selected species

 Royal Botanic Gardens, Kew's Plants of the World Online lists around 460 species of plants in the genus Erigeron. Selected species include:

The following names are not accepted  in Royal Botanic Gardens, Kew's Plants of the World Online database:

Erigeron acer – blue fleabane
Erigeron austiniae
Erigeron corymbosus – long-leaf fleabane
Erigeron greenei
Erigeron hultenii – Hulten's fleabane
Erigeron irazuensis

References

 
Asteraceae genera
Taxa named by Carl Linnaeus